The 37th Gawad Urian Awards or Ika-37 na Gawad Urian were held on June 17, 2014, at the Dolphy Theater in Quezon City. They honored the best Filipino films for the year 2013.

Nominations were announced on April 29, 2014, at a press conference. Rody Vera received triple nominations in the Best Screenplay category. Angel Aquino, Adjani Arumpac and Corinne de San Jose received double nominations in Best Supporting Actress, Best Documentary and Best Sound respectively. On the other hand, Armando Lao received the most number of nominations with four.

Norte, Hangganan ng Kasaysayan dominated the ceremony which received 4 awards, including Best Film. The Natatanging Gawad Urian was supposed to be given to Mike de Leon but he declined to receive the award. This is only the second time in which this special award was not given, the first being in 1989. Instead, they paid tribute to late National Artist for Film Gerardo de Leon.

Winners and nominees

Multiple nominations and awards

References

External links
 Official Website of the Manunuri ng Pelikulang Pilipino

Gawad Urian Awards
2013 film awards
2014 in Philippine cinema